The 90th Boat Race took place on 2 April 1938.  Held annually, the Boat Race is a side-by-side rowing race between crews from the Universities of Oxford and Cambridge along the River Thames. It was the first Boat Race to be televised.  In a race umpired by the former Cambridge rower and coach Harold Rickett, Oxford won by two lengths in a time of 20 minutes 30 seconds. The victory took the overall record in the event to 47–42 in Cambridge's favour.

Background
The Boat Race is a side-by-side rowing competition between the University of Oxford (sometimes referred to as the "Dark Blues") and the University of Cambridge (sometimes referred to as the "Light Blues").  The race was first held in 1829, and since 1845 has taken place on the  Championship Course on the River Thames in southwest London.  The rivalry is a major point of honour between the two universities; it is followed throughout the United Kingdom and, as of 2014, broadcast worldwide.  Oxford went into the race as reigning champions, having won the 1937 race by three lengths, with Cambridge leading overall with 47 victories to Oxford's 41 (excluding the "dead heat" of 1877).

Cambridge were coached by D. H. E. McCowen (who had rowed in the 1932 race), Derek Mays-Smith, R. H. H. Symonds (who had rowed in the 1931 race) and C. W. Wise.  Oxford's coaches were P. C. Mallam (a four-time Dark Blue who had rowed in the 1921, 1922, 1923 and 1924 races), Guy Oliver Nickalls (who had rowed three times between 1921 and 1923) and  J. H. Page.  The umpire for the race was the former Cambridge rower Harold Rickett who had rowed for the Light Blues three times, in the 1930, 1931 and 1932 races.  He had also coached them for the 1933 race, and had umpired the race the previous year.

Oxford had been rated as favourites to win the race throughout their three months of training. The rowing correspondent for The Times noted that "both crews are absolutely first-rate exponents of their respective styles" and that "both coxes are first-rate".  Oxford elected to use the same boat as they raced in for the previous year's event, while Cambridge used a new vessel;  both were built by George Sims Boatbuilding Company of Hammersmith.  It was the first year that the Boat Race was televised, which, according to the television correspondent for The Observer, "was a great success" and "not even the umpire knew more about the race than we [the viewers]".

Crews
Cambridge's crew contained three participants with Boat Race experience, in A. Burrough, T. B. Langton and T. H. Hunter. Oxford saw five former Blues return to the crew, including John Cherry who was making his third consecutive appearance in the event. Two of the participants were registered as non-British, both in the Cambridge crew:  number six G. Keppel and cox T. H. Hunter were both American.

Race

Cambridge won the toss and elected to start from the Surrey station, handing the Middlesex side of the river to Oxford. Umpire Rickett started the race at 2 p.m. in "fine" weather conditions and with a strong tide.  Despite being out-rated by three strokes per minute, Oxford took an immediate lead and were over half a length ahead by the time they passed Fulham Wall. With the Middlesex bend in their favour, Oxford increased their lead to a length and a half ahead by the Mile Post.  Cambridge's stroke Eadie called for a push just before Harrods Furniture Depository and the Light Blues began to reduce the deficit, and although the Dark Blues responded, by the time the crews passed below Hammersmith Bridge, Oxford's lead was down to half a length.

Cambridge's faster stroke rate saw them gain on the Dark Blues and by the time the passed HMS Stork, they held a quarter-length lead, although by Chiswick Steps the lead was gone and Oxford led by a quarter of a length.  They passed below Barnes Bridge with that lead as both crews headed into rough water.  According to the special correspondent writing in The Manchester Guardian, "a sea awaited them".  Both crews took on water in the difficult conditions but the Dark Blues prevailed.  Oxford won by two lengths in a time of 20 minutes 30 seconds, their second consecutive win.  It was the narrowest margin of victory since the 1930 race and the fastest since the 1935 race.  The victory took the overall record in the event to 47–42 in Cambridge's favour.  The correspondent for The Manchester Guardian described it as "excellent", and "a great race in the best traditions"  The Observer correspondent suggested that "the race will rank as one of the closest and most exciting in which the two Universities have ever engaged."  The former Oxford rower, G. I. F. Thomson, writing in The Observer, claimed "one can scarcely have hoped for a more interesting or thrilling race".  Oxford's number seven and boat club president Cherry said "I hope this will show that last year's victory was not a flash in the pan".   His counterpart, T. B. Langton noted that his crew "had an excellent race and enjoyed every minute of it".

References
Notes

Bibliography

External links
 Official website
 Meet the Cambridge crew at British Pathé

1938 in English sport
The Boat Race
April 1938 sports events
1938 sports events in London